The Constitutional Court of Colombia is the supreme constitutional court of Colombia. Part of the Judiciary, it is the final appellate court for matters involving interpretation of the Constitution with the power to determine the constitutionality of laws, acts, and statutes.

The court was first established by the Constitution of 1991, and its first session began in March 1992. The court is housed within the shared judicial complex of the Palace of Justice located on the north side of Bolívar Square in the  neighbourhood of Bogotá.

The Constitutional Court consists of nine magistrates who are elected by the Senate of Colombia from ternary lists drawn up by the President, the Supreme Court of Justice, and the Council of State. The magistrates serve for a term of eight years. The court is headed by a President and Vice President.

Composition

Current justices

Cristina Pardo Schlesinger  (President)
Diana Constanza Fajardo Rivera (Deputy President)
Jorge Enrique Ibañez Najar 
Alejandro Linares Cantillo 
Paola Andrea Meneses Mosquera
Gloria Stella Ortíz Delgado
José Fernando Reyes Cuartas
Antonio José Lizarazo Ocampo
 Natalia Ángel Cabo

Further reading

External links
 

 
Constitution of Colombia
Judiciary of Colombia
Colombia
1991 establishments in Colombia
Courts and tribunals established in 1991